Vijay Bahadur Pathak  is an Indian politician from the state of Uttar Pradesh who is a leader of Bharatiya Janta Party State Vice President. He is also a member of the Uttar Pradesh Legislative Council.

Early life

Pathak was born in a middle-class Brahmin family. He is associated with a political family. 1 January 1968, his father Shri Radheshyam Pathak (a RSS activist) was the candidate of Bhartiya Jana Sangh.

Political career

In 1986, Pathak was the president of Bharatiya Janata Yuva Morcha of Azamgarh city unit . In 1987, he was elected as president of Student union of Shri Durga Ji Graduate College, Chandeshwar Azamgarh.               
In 1988, he was the member of State Working Committee of the Bharatiya Janata Yuva Morcha Uttar Pradesh. In 1989, he was made political secretary to Shri Kalraj MishraJi. In 1990, he was made State Secretary Bharatiya Janata Yuva Morcha, Uttar Pradesh.  He played a key role in the conduct of political activities while staying at BJP headquarters during the Ram Janmabhoomi movement. He became member of BJP Uttar Pradesh Working Committee from 1994. In 1997, he was Public Relations Officer of Shri Kalraj MishraJi, Minister of Uttar Pradesh Government. In 1998 he became the Vice President of Uttar Pradesh Olympics Association . He was made State Media Incharge of BJP in 2000. He also contested In 2002 Uttar Pradesh Legislative Assembly election for BJP from Nizamabad Vidhan Sabha Constituency. In 2005 he became the party spokesman. He also became the joint secretary of the Archery Association and President of Azamgarh Olympic Association. 
He was given the responsibility of the State Spokesperson of the Bharatiya Janta Party Uttar Pradesh state unit on 2 August 2010.
He was appointed State general secretary for BJP Uttar Pradesh on 9 July 2016. On 9 February 2018 he was re-elected as State general secretary.  On 19 April 2018 he was elected as the Member of Uttar Pradesh Legislative Council, 22 August 2020 Working As a Vice President of Bharatiya Janta Party Uttar Pradesh Uttar Pradesh.

References

External links

Vijay Bahadur Pathak Facebook
https://hindi.news18.com/news/uttar-pradesh/lucknow-up-mlc-election-bjp-candidates-vijay-bahadur-pathak-sarojini-agrawal-richest-candidates-1345702.html
https://m.timesofindia.com/india/up-mlc-elections-on-april-26-sp-bsp-may-come-together-to-field-a-common-candidate/amp_articleshow/63586461.cms
http://www.dailypioneer.com/state-editions/lucknow/bjp-announces-name-of-candidates-for-biennial-polls-in-up.html

Members of the Uttar Pradesh Legislative Council
Bharatiya Janata Party politicians from Uttar Pradesh
Living people
1968 births